This is a list of public art in Lake County, Indiana.

This list applies only to works of public art accessible in an outdoor public space. For example, this does not include artwork visible inside a museum.  

Most of the works mentioned are sculptures. When this is not the case (i.e. sound installation, for example) it is stated next to the title.

Crown Point

Dyer

East Chicago

Gary

Hammond

Merrillville

Munster

Whiting

References

Lake County
Tourist attractions in Lake County, Indiana